The 1947 European Wrestling Championships were held in 11–14 April 1947 Prague, Czechoslovakia. Only Greco-Roman wrestling competitions were held, in which representatives of 15 countries participated. It was the first European Wrestling Championship in which Soviet wrestlers took part.

Medal table

Medal summary

Men's Greco-Roman

References

External links
FILA Database

1947 in Czechoslovak sport

1949 in European sport
Sports competitions in Prague